Brother Island is a small, uninhabited island off the coast of Goat Island in the U.S. state of New York. It lies in the Niagara River, close to the Horseshoe Falls and the Three Sisters Islands. It is part of the city of Niagara Falls.

It is one of only five islands in the area surrounding the Horseshoe Falls which have not been claimed by Canada.

References

External links 
Topographic map

Niagara Falls
Islands of Niagara County, New York
Niagara Falls, New York
Islands of the Niagara River
River islands of New York (state)
Islands of New York (state)
Uninhabited islands of New York (state)